Brocken is a mountain rising over  close southwest of Calf Head on the north side of South Georgia. It was named by the German group of the International Polar Year Investigations, 1882–83, after the Brocken, the highest mountain in central Germany.

References
 

Mountains and hills of South Georgia